Sivak may refer to:
Sibak, Chaharmahal and Bakhtiari, a village also known as Sivak, in Chaharmahal and Bakhtiari Province, Iran
Sivak (surname)